The 2009 South Sydney Rabbitohs season in Australian rugby league was the 100th in the club's history. They competed in the NRL's 2009 Telstra Premiership, and despite being in 1st position at some points during the year and scoring over 500 points in a season for the first time, they finished 10th out of 16 teams and so failed to reach the play-offs.

In Round 25, South Sydney defeated the minor premiers St. George Illawarra Dragons 41 to 6. This is the only loss greater than 20 points the Dragons have suffered since Wayne Bennett's inception as coach.

John Sutton was awarded the George Piggins Medal for Souths player of the year.

On the ensuing 'Mad Monday', coach Jason Taylor and forward David Fa'alogo were involved in a drunken altercation and both sacked from the club. This prompted the club's co-owner Russell Crowe to write an 800-word letter of apology to a Sydney newspaper.

Pre season
The Rabbitohs played three pre-season games in 2009.

Regular season

Statistics

Ladder

Kit and Sponsors

National Australia Bank
The National Australia Bank was the Rabbitohs major home sponsor for the 2009 Telstra Premiership.

DeLonghi
DeLonghi was the major away sponsor for the Rabbitohs in the 2009 Telstra Premiership.

V8 Supercars Australia
V8 Supercars was the Rabbitohs major sleeve sponsor for the 2009 Telstra Premiership.

Virgin Blue
Virgin Blue was the Rabbitohs major training sponsor for the 2009 Telstra Premiership.

2009 squad
 

 

 

Source:

Player statistics

Representative honours

References

South Sydney Rabbitohs seasons
South Sydney Rabbitohs season